Broken Harbour is a crime novel written by  Irish novelist Tana French, originally published on 2 July 2012 by  Hatchette Books Ireland. It is the 4th book in the Dublin Murder Squad series and was first published in the USA by Viking Penguin a member of the Penguin Group (USA). Tana French was honored with the 'Irish Crime Fiction Award' a bestseller list, eventually reaching the No.3 position. It was also listed in the 'Ireland AM Crime Fiction Books of the Year 2009–2013'.

By April 2013, the book had stormed into the Irish book charts to occupy the 3rd position as a best seller. It was also listed in the 'Ireland AM Crime Fiction Books of the Year 2009–2013'.

Plot
In a ghost estate outside Dublin – half-built, half-inhabited, half-abandoned – two children and their father are dead. The mother is on her way to intensive care. Scorcher Kennedy is given the case because he is the Murder Squad’s star detective. At first he and his rookie partner, Richie, think this is a simple one: Pat Spain was a casualty of the recession, so he killed his children, tried to kill his wife Jenny, and finished off with himself. But there are too many inexplicable details and the evidence is pointing in two directions at once.

Scorcher’s personal life is tugging for his attention. Seeing the case on the news has sent his sister Dina off the rails again, and she’s resurrecting something that Scorcher thought he had tightly under control: what happened to their family, one summer at Broken Harbour, back when they were children. The neat compartments of his life are breaking down, and the sudden tangle of work and family is putting both at risk.

Characters
 Michael (Scorcher) Kennedy: Detective at the Dublin Murder Squad with an enviable reputation described as 'on the Murder Squad for ten years, and for seven of those, had the highest solve rate in the place'
 Richie Curran  : a rookie assigned to work with Mick.
 Dr Cooper : Chief Medical Examiner
 Dina Kennedy : Mike's younger sister, described as 'one of those old pen-and-ink sketches of fairies: slight as a dancer, with skin that never tans, full pale lips and huge blue eyes'.
 Spain family : Patrick Spain (husband), Jennifer Spain (Wife) and children Emma & Jack- as the victims of the crime.

Reception

 ' Broken Harbour is a tale about the different facets of obsession and insanity, and it winds up to a finale that is almost too distressing. The best yet of French's four excellent thrillers, it leaves its readers – just like the Spains – throat-deep in terror. ' - The Guardian 
 ' Broken Harbour proves anew that (Tana French)  is one of the most talented crime writers alive. '- The Washington Post
 ' Instated Ms. French as one of crime fiction’s reigning grand dames — a Celtic tigress. ' - The Washington Times

Awards and Nomination

 Dilys Award Nominee (2013)
 Los Angeles Times Book Prize for Mystery/Thriller (2012)
 Bord Gáis Energy Irish Book Award for Ireland AM Crime Fiction Award (2012)
 Goodreads Choice Award Nominee for Best Mystery & Thriller (2013)

References

External links

2012 Irish novels
Irish crime novels
Novels set in Ireland
Works by Tana French
Viking Press books